The 1936–37 AHL season was the first season of the International-American Hockey League, known in the present day as the American Hockey League. The IAHL was formed when the International Hockey League and the Canadian-American Hockey League agreed to play an interlocking schedule after being cut down to only four teams each.

The IAHL was structured as a "circuit of mutual convenience" with eight teams in two divisions, scheduled to play a 48 game season. The IHL formed the West Division, and the CAHL served as the East Division. The Buffalo Bisons were forced to suspend operations on December 6, 1936, due to financial woes.

The F. G. "Teddy" Oke Trophy was carried over by the West Division from the International Hockey League, and was awarded to the Syracuse Stars as West Division champions. The Syracuse Stars also won the inaugural Calder Cup by defeating the Philadelphia Ramblers for the championship.

Final standings
Note: GP = Games played; W = Wins; L = Losses; T = Ties; GF = Goals for; GA = Goals against; Pts = Points;

†Suspended operations.

Scoring Leaders

Note: GP = Games played; G = Goals; A = Assists; Pts = Points; PIM = Penalty minutes

Calder Cup Playoffs

See also
List of AHL seasons

References
AHL official site
AHL Hall of Fame
HockeyDB
hockeyleaguehistory.com

American Hockey League seasons
2